The practice of dog meat in Korea originated predominantly from the Khitan refugees who spilled into Korea during the Goryeo (Koryo) Dynasty. These people were assimilated into the Joseon Dynasty as the Baekjeong class, the first class of butchers, considered the lowest class in Joseon society.  The people who traditionally consume dog meat have been predominantly descendants of this class and tend to be elderly, poor, and rural. For the past few decades, consuming dog meat has been controversial, especially within South Korea, due to conflicts between Korean animal rights activists calling for a ban of dog meat versus those who view the attacks as hypocritical for attacking only one type of meat consumption, rather than all meat consumption. 

Consumption of dog meat has experienced a precipitous decline over the past three decades in South Korea, mainly due to the demographic decline of the minority that consumes dog meat. Estimates of the number of animals consumed vary widely. The often quoted estimates of 1-2 million (by the Korean animal rights group KARA) are not based on actual data and have no scientific basis. Estimates are closer to tens of thousands per year based on actual sales at the major markets in 2017. However, the numbers have declined since then, given that all of the major markets have since shut down.

The largest dog meat market, Moran Market, officially shut down in 2018 following years of declining sales; though, some illegal sales were discovered in 2021. According to the Ministry of Agriculture, Food and Rural Affairs, approximately 200 dog farms have been reported. In 2018, the Taepyeong-dong complex, which served as a slaughterhouse for dogs, was closed by the South Korean government. This move came five years after a vote by the city council of Seongnam, the city where the slaughterhouse was located. In a 2020 survey, 84% of the Korean population reported never having consumed dog meat nor having plans to ever do so.

In June 2018, a South Korean municipal court ruled that killing dogs for their meat was illegal, though this law did not make it illegal to consume dog meat.

History 
As a general practice, dog meat has never been a mainstream part of the Korean diet throughout the nation's history. The consumption of dog meat can be traced back to antiquity in isolated cases, and dog bones were excavated in a neolithic settlement in Changnyeong, South Gyeongsang Province. A wall painting in the Goguryeo tombs complex in South Hwanghae Province, North Korea, a UNESCO World Heritage site dating from the 4th century CE, depicts a slaughtered dog.

Starting in the Silla Dynasty (57 BCE – 935 CE) and then during the Goryeo Dynasty (918–1392 CE), Buddhism was the state religion and eating beef was considered immoral and was at first discouraged and then banned (as oxen were regarded as human work companions). In general, animal life was regarded as sacred and eating meat was minimized; however, eating seafood remained common.

During the latter part of the Goryeo Dynasty, the practice of eating dog meat was introduced by the nomadic Khitans and possibly other ethnic groups (from Manchuria), who as displaced war refugees spilled into Goryeo during the Mongol invasions. The invading Mongols lifted the beef ban and legalized the consumption of meat during their rule. During the Joseon Dynasty (1392–1910 CE), the minority Khitans eventually assimilated into the social structure as the "Baekjeong," the first butcher class, occupying the lowest class of society. The Joseon government assigned the Baekjeong the task of addressing the feral dog problem, and thus dog meat became a food item for the poor (and lower classes). During the Joseon Dynasty, certain government officials argued that dogs were human companions and advocated for banning the consumption of dog meat.

In approximately 1816, Jeong Hak-yu, the second son of Jeong Yak-yong, a prominent politician and scholar of Joseon dynasty at the time, wrote a poem called Nongga Wollyeongga (농가월령가), which describes what farming families did each month of the year. In the description of the month of August, the poem tells of a married woman visiting her birth parents with boiled dog meat, rice cakes, and rice wine, thus indicating the practice at the time in a rural farming community (Ahn, 2000; Seo, 2002). Dongguksesigi (동국세시기), a book written by Korean scholar Hong Seok-mo in 1849, contains a recipe for Bosintang including a boiled dog, green onions, and red chili pepper powder.

The three hottest days of summer, set by the lunar calendar, are traditionally called Sambok (三伏), during which Koreans typically eat Samgyetang (ginseng chicken soup) or Chogyetang (cold chicken soup). Some Koreans had chosen to instead consume Bosintang, a soup containing dog meat; however, this practice has become increasingly rare.

Current situation 

In 2019, fewer than 100 restaurants served dog meat in Seoul (out of over 520,000 restaurants in Greater Seoul), as the numbers have continued to decline each year. Some restaurants are reporting declines in consumption of 20–30% per year. A 2022 Chosun Ilbo report found that customers of the dog meat market tended to be foreigners or elderly (above 70 years old).

In 2017-2019 all major dog meat markets had shut down across South Korea, mainly due to declining sales. In 2021, the last major dog meat market remaining is shutting down in Daegu.

On November 21, 2018, South Korea closed the country's main dog slaughterhouse, known as Taepyeong-dong. The slaughterhouse was located in Seongnam. The Seongnam city council, which voted in 2013 to close the slaughterhouse, will turn the area into a community park.

Most Korean Buddhists consider eating any kind of meat or dairy as a moral offense. Catholic Koreans tend to consume dog meat at a higher frequency than other religions in Korea. In general, the rise of Christianity has contributed to the rise in meat consumption of all types throughout East Asia.

While the consumption of dog meat has declined greatly, the excess of dogs from puppy mills of the pet industry and the growing population of dogs in shelters have emerged as much greater problems. Over the past decade there have been repeated campaigns by Korean animal welfare and government agencies to adopt abandoned and mixed breed dogs.

In 2022, the  Ministry for Food, Agriculture, Forestry and Fisheries of South Korea published a first official report called "Edible dog breeding and distribution survey". According to the report, as of February 2022, 521,121 dogs are reared in 1,156 dog meat farms and 388,000 dogs are consumed in 1,666 restaurants per year. According to the "Public Perception Survey on Dog Eating", 55.8% of respondents said that our society should stop eating dogs, while 28.4% of respondents answered that dog food should be maintained as it is. As for the legalization of dog slaughter, 52.7% of respondents were against it and 39.2% were in favor of it. About 85.5% of respondents said they do not currently eat dog meat, and 14.1% said they do.

Dogs used for meat
The primary dog breed raised for meat is a non-specific landrace commonly named as Nureongi (누렁이), or Hwanggu (황구).  Nureongi are not the only type of dog currently slaughtered for their meat in South Korea.  In 2015, The Korea Observer reported that many different pet breeds of dog are bred to be eaten, including, for example, labradors, retrievers, and cocker spaniels, and that the dogs slaughtered for their meat often include former pets.
Humane Society International/Korea has been working cooperatively with dog farmers since 2015 to help them close their farms, and rehome the dogs. As of August 2020, HSI has closed down 16 dog meat farms and rescued more than 2,000 dogs. The charity documents every farm closure to show the conditions, and it is clear that all breeds of dog are found on these facilities including golden retrievers, beagles, poodles and huskies alongside tosas and jindos.

The prior practice has been to slaughter the dogs by electrocution, though some were hung or beaten over the head before exsanguination. Such practices are illegal under the 2007 Animal Protection Act and have become increasingly rare.

Legal status
Between 1975 and 1978, dogs had the full legal status of livestock animals in South Korea, but the legality of the dog meat trade is now highly disputed.  South Korea adopted its first Animal Protection Law in May, 1991.

Currently, Article 7 of the Animal Protection Act does not explicitly prohibit the slaughter of dogs for food; however, it "prohibits killing animals in a brutal way".  In addition, it "forbids killing the dogs in open areas such as on the street or in front of other animals of the same species".

Dog meat is subject to the Food Sanitation Act/Food Hygiene Act of 1962, which simply defines food as "all foodstuff, except taken as medicine". However, unlike beef, pork, or poultry, dog meat is excluded from the list of livestock under the Livestock Processing Act of 1962, which is "the principal statute governing hygienic slaughtering of livestock and processing of meat." Hence, dog meat farming is under-regulated compared to that of other stock animals.

As a result, there are no regulations requiring the humane slaughter of dogs for meat, though the treatment of dogs falls under animal cruelty laws. The controversy over dog meat consumption often centers on the slaughtering methods employed, which include electrocution, strangulation by hanging, and physically beating the dog to death. According to reports from 1999, some dogs were still alive when they were blow-torched or thrown into boiling water to remove their fur. In more recent decades, such practices are being prosecuted by law.

In 2008, the Seoul Metropolitan Government proposed a recommendation to the national government to add dogs to the list of livestock whose slaughter is regulated by law. However, activist groups attacked the proposal as legitimizing or legalizing the trade in dog meat. The city dropped the proposal, but an official from the national government was quoted as saying “It’s the sole idea of the city. We have not been consulted at all ... I don’t think we are planning to even consider this option.”

In June 2018, the municipal court of the city of Bucheon ruled that killing dogs for their meat was illegal. The landmark decision came after much criticism from animal advocates in the country. The court case was brought forward by animal rights group Coexistence of Animal Rights on Earth (Care) against a dog farm, which they said was killing animals without a real reason.

On September 27, 2021, South Korean President Moon Jae-in raised the possibility of a ban on dog meat consumption in the country.

Types of dishes

Bosintang (보신탕; 補身湯); Gaejangguk  (개장국) Stew containing boiled dog meat and vegetables.
Gaegogi Jeongol (개고기 전골) – An elaborate dog stew made in a large Jeongol pan.
Gae Suyuk (개 수육; 개水肉)- Boiled dog meat
Gaegogi Muchim (개고기 무침) – Steamed dog meat, Korean leeks (부추), and vegetables mixed with spices
Gaesoju (개소주; 개燒酒) – Mixed drink containing dog meat and other Chinese medicine ingredients such as ginger, chestnut, and jujube to invigorate one's health.

International attention
In 1984, preceding the 1988 Summer Olympics in Seoul, the South Korean government banned the sale of dog meat within the four gates of downtown Seoul. In 2001, prior to the 2002 FIFA World Cup, the organizers of the games, under pressure from animal rights groups such as PETA, demanded that the Korean government re-address the issue. Brigitte Bardot, head of La Fondation Brigitte Bardot, launched a campaign during the 2002 FIFA World Cup to have dog meat outlawed in Korea and encouraged a boycott of the games unless a ban took place. Bardot was in turn heavily critiqued and ridiculed for being extremely rude and condescending in her public interactions, which included calling Koreans "savage" people and hanging up on reporters during televised interviews.

In October 2018, a leading Egyptian MP (Margaret Azer) suggested that Egypt export stray dogs for meat consumption to countries like South Korea as a solution to the problem of overpopulation of stray dogs in the country. Azer's statements sparked a wave of criticism among animal rights advocates and rescuers in Egypt, although no such plans were ever proven to be in place. This statement was made when major dog meat markets had already shut down in South Korea due to lack of demand.

Korean migrant workers living abroad and Asian American children have faced discrimination, bullying, and racism due to the stereotype of Koreans eating dog meat. Such racist actions have persisted, even though eating dog meat is not a widespread practice in Korea. In 2021, Park Ji-Sung, a fan-favorite former player for Manchester United, asked the soccer club's fans to stop singing a song in his honor that includes the stereotype that Koreans eat dog meat.

Asian Americans, including Korean Americans, have for many decades been subjected to racist stereotypes of Koreans and other Asians as dog eaters. An example is TV host Jay Leno, who had repeatedly recycled stereotypes of Koreans eating dog meat in his jokes. In one instance, during the 2002 Winter Olympics, Jay Leno joked that the South Korean Olympic short-track skater Kim Dong-Sung would eat his dog. The MCIC Group filed a class-action lawsuit against Leno on behalf of 50,000 Korean Americans, demanding an apology and monetary damages. Jay Leno finally apologized in 2021 for decades of making racist jokes.

Amidst the decline in dog meat consumption in contemporary Korea, a vocal group in Korea has critiqued the international outcry toward dog meat consumption as being hypocritical. International animal rights activists have noted the hypocrisy, as well, given the horrific conditions under which factory farmed animals are raised in the West. Some Korean citizens, as well as members of the international community, have pointed out that the nations from which most of the outcry has emerged have the highest per capita meat consumption on the planet, several-fold higher than that of South Korea.

Controversy
In South Korea, a minority of people (~3.9% of the population, based on a 2018 survey) consume dog meat, predominantly as Bosintang (literally "body protecting soup"), which is thought to have  medicinal properties. Consuming dog meat is also a minority practice in China.

Most Korean Buddhists consider eating any kind of meat or dairy as a moral offense. Catholic Koreans tend to consume dog meat at a higher frequency than other religions in Korea. In general, the rise of Christianity has contributed to the increase in meat consumption in East Asia.

In 2020, Nielsen Online Research conducted two surveys of 1,000 people from June to September. From the survey, 83.8% of South Koreans stated that they have never consumed dog meat and had no plans to consume it in the future. 58.6% supported the ban on dog meat, and 57% said that consumption of dog meat had an effect on creating negative perceptions of South Korea. Human Society International said, "Most Koreans do not consume dog meat, and a growing population recognizes dogs as companion animals, not edible."

The animal welfare advocacy group Animal Welfare Institute has called for letters of protest about the dog meat trade to be sent to the South Korean president and ambassador to the United States prior to South Korea hosting the 2018 Winter Olympics.
The charity World Dog Alliance raised a successful online petition in 2012 calling for the UK Government to intervene and oppose the cruelty. In 2015, the issue was finally debated in the House of Commons Chamber. A second debate on South Korea's dog meat trade in the UK Parliament was held on September 12, 2016, by the Petitions Committee, following an online petition which was started on petition.parliament.uk. Change.org has over 450,000 signatures on a petition to boycott the 2018 Winter Olympics. In 2018 Humane Society International/Korea, Korea Animal Rights Advocates (KARA), and petition site Care2 hand-delivered a petition of 1 million signatures to the President's residence, the Blue House, in Seoul, with a letter urging him to initiate a phase-out of dog meat farms.

A 2019 study found that farmed dogs had over twice as high levels of cortisol in hair compared pet dogs, suggesting that dogs on meat farms experience chronic physiological stress. The results, therefore, support the need for changes in the regulations, policy and legislation surrounding the farming of dogs for meat.

Political debate 
From the late 2010s, South Korean liberals, including Democratic Party and Justice Party, began actively questioning dog meat culture. As a result, there is a severe conflict between the views of the liberal camp and the conservative camp in South Korea. Liberals who confront Confucian social conservatism in South Korea, basically criticize dog meat culture as immoral. President Moon Jae-in said he was even considering a legal ban on dog meat on September 28, 2021. Moon's view gained strong support from animal rights groups. Shortly after Moon's remarks on dog meat, People Power Party spokesman Yang Joon-woo strongly criticized Moon, saying, "The state does not have the right to regulate individual tastes or eating habits". In addition, Yoon Seok-youl, a former PPP candidate for the 2022 South Korean presidential election and current president of South Korea, criticized South Korea's liberal camp on November 2, 2021, saying that "pet dog" and "eating dogs" should be distinguished. Ahn Cheol-soo pledged to gradually ban dog meat eating during the 2017 South Korean presidential election.

See also 

 Nureongi
 Taboo food and drink
 Animal welfare and rights in South Korea
 Anti-Korean sentiment

Notes

References

Sources

 Ahn, Y. (2000). 한국인과 개고기 [Koreans and dog meat]. Seoul: Hyoil.
 Seo, J. (2002). 한국무속인열전 1 [Korean Shamans I]. Seoul: Woosuk Publishing.

Further reading 
  (contains some recipes)
 
 An English translation of the Korean Animal Protection Law (2007)

External links 

 Do Koreans Really Eat Dog? About.com
 Dog meat: Koreans are divided over the issue BBC

South Korean meat dishes
Dog meat